Niklas Eg (born 6 January 1995) is a Danish cyclist, who currently rides for UCI ProTeam .

Career
Eg was born in Kibæk.

Trek–Segafredo (2018–present)
After signing an initial two-year contract with the team in September 2017, Eg opened the 2018 season in Australia, and was close to the top 10 in the Herald Sun Tour, where he finished 12th overall. Eg finished 7th on the last stage of the Abu Dhabi Tour to Jebel Hafeet, while at the Tour of Croatia, Eg finished 5th overall. He started the Giro d'Italia, his first Grand Tour, finishing 93rd.

In August 2019, he was named in the startlist for the 2019 Vuelta a España. In August 2020, he was named in the startlist for the 2020 Tour de France.

Major results

2017
 2nd Overall Kreiz Breizh Elites
 2nd Overall Grand Prix Priessnitz spa
 3rd Overall Tour de l'Avenir
 4th Overall Giro della Valle d'Aosta
 6th Sundvolden GP
2018
 5th Overall Tour of Croatia
2019
 5th Overall Tour of Utah
2021
 9th Overall Giro di Sicilia
2022
 6th Overall Tour de Hongrie

Grand Tour classification results timeline

References

External links

1995 births
Living people
Danish male cyclists
People from Herning Municipality
Sportspeople from the Central Denmark Region